The GM R platform is a platform manufactured by General Motors from 1985 through 1993.

Vehicles
1985–1988 Chevrolet Spectrum
1985–1986 Holden Gemini
1985–1993 Isuzu Gemini
1985–1989 Isuzu I-Mark
1985–1990 Chevrolet Gemini
1985–1989 Pontiac Sunburst
1988–1989 Geo Spectrum
1990–1993 Isuzu Piazza
1990–1993 Isuzu Impulse
1990–1993 Asüna Sunfire
1990–1993 Isuzu Stylus

References 

R